Luis Carrasco (born 18 September 1915; date of death unknown) was a Chilean basketball player. He competed in the 1936 Summer Olympics.

References

External links

1915 births
Year of death missing
Chilean men's basketball players
Olympic basketball players of Chile
Basketball players at the 1936 Summer Olympics
Sportspeople from Santiago